Summerfield is an unincorporated community in northeast Claiborne Parish, Louisiana, United States. It is located sixteen miles east of the parish seat of Homer.

History
Summerfield was founded in 1868 by W. R. Kennedy.

The community has a Baptist church, founded in 1881, and a Methodist church, founded in 1876.

Education
The Claiborne Parish School Board operates Summerfield High School, a Pre-K–12 high school, in Summerfield.

Media
Summerfield lies in proximity to the Monroe/El Dorado, Arkansas DMA market. Although in the Shreveport market, Monroe channels such as KTVE and KNOE can be received through an over the air antenna. Satellite subscribers receive their media from KTBS and KSLA, the ABC and CBS outlets in Shreveport.

Infrastructure
The United States Postal Service operates the small Summerfield Post Office.

Highways such as LA Hwy 9 and LA Alternate 2 run through Summerfield as well as other rural parish roads.

Notable people
Karl Malone, Hall of Fame basketball player at Louisiana Tech University, and the Utah Jazz. Malone also holds two Olympic gold medals for basketball.

Demetress Bell, American football offensive tackle at Northwestern State, Buffalo Bills, Philadelphia Eagles and the Dallas Cowboys.

References

Unincorporated communities in Claiborne Parish, Louisiana
Unincorporated communities in Louisiana
1868 establishments in Louisiana